The Bowery Hotel is a hotel at 335 Bowery, in the East Village, New York City, which was founded, developed and conceived of by the nightlife and hospitality impresario Eric Goode.

Notable guests have included Zayn Malik, Jennifer Jason Leigh, Gigi Hadid, Jennifer Lopez, Liv Tyler, Kate Hudson, Sting, Keith Richards, Bruce Willis, Kiefer Sutherland, Blake Lively, Jude Law, Robert Pattinson, Alison Brie, Jonah Hill, Chris Hemsworth, David Beckham,Charlotte Gainsbourg and Kristen Stewart.

In 2011 Paul McCartney and Nancy Shevell held a second celebration of their betrothal at the hotel. Guests at the fete included Barbara Walters (Shevell's second cousin, who introduced the couple), then–New York City mayor Michael Bloomberg, Ralph Lauren, Yoko Ono, and Sean Lennon.

The painter Domingo Zapata has kept an art studio atop the hotel.

The restaurant in the hotel is Gemma.

Pets weighing 30 lbs. or less are allowed.

The hotel is referenced in the song "It Ain't Me" by Kygo and Selena Gomez. Father John Misty's 2018 album God's Favourite Customer was inspired by a 2-month period in which the singer-songwriter's life 'blew up' and he spent the duration of this period living in the hotel.

References

External links

 

Residential buildings completed in 1927
Hotels in Manhattan
1927 establishments in New York (state)